Ignacio Fernandez Rouyet (born 22 October 1978, in Buenos Aires) is an Argentina-born Italian rugby union player.

Rouyet, who is a prop, played for Rugby Viadana before signing for Benetton Treviso in 2009. He made his debut for Italy against South Africa in Cape Town on 21 June 2008. He had 7 caps, the last one being in 2009.

References

External links 
 ESPN Sport

1978 births
Living people
Argentine rugby union players
Italian rugby union players
Rugby Viadana players
Benetton Rugby players
Rugby union props
Italy international rugby union players
Argentine emigrants to Italy
Rugby union players from Buenos Aires